Jonathan Castillo may refer to:
 Jonathan Castillo (footballer, born 1993)
 Jonathan Castillo (footballer, born 2001)